This is a list of listed buildings in Copenhagen Municipality, Denmark.

City Centre

A/Å

B

D

E

F

G

H

K

L

M

N

O/Ø

P

R

S

T

V

Christianshavn
 Listed buildings in Christianshavn

Slotsholmen

Bispebjerg

Brønshøj

Nørrebro 
 Listed buildings in Nørrebro

Vesterbro/Kongens Enghave 
 Listed buildings in Vesterbro/Kongens Enghave

Østerbro 
 Listed buildings in Østerbro

Delisted buildings in Copenhagen

See also
 List of churches in Copenhagen

References

External links 
 Danish Agency of Culture

Lists of buildings and structures in Copenhagen
 
 
Copenhagen